Shadowgraphy may refer to:

 Shadowgraphy (performing art), using hand shadows
 Shadow play or shadow puppetry, performing art using cut-out figures
 Radiography, the use of X-rays
 Shadowgraph or shadowgram, an optical method that reveals non-uniformities in transparent media
 Shadowgraph, an electromagnetic and optical device once used as an alternative to magic eye tube